Tomoyuki Suzuki (鈴木 智幸, born December 20, 1985) is a Japanese football player for Iwate Grulla Morioka.

Club statistics
Updated to end of 2018 season.

References

External links
Profile at Matsumoto Yamaga

1985 births
Living people
Kokushikan University alumni
Association football people from Saitama Prefecture
Japanese footballers
J2 League players
J3 League players
Tokyo Verdy players
Tochigi SC players
Matsumoto Yamaga FC players
Iwate Grulla Morioka players
Association football goalkeepers